Paracartus is a genus of beetles in the family Cerambycidae, containing the following species:

 Paracartus aureovitticollis Breuning, 1958
 Paracartus coffini Téocchi, 1991
 Paracartus fasciculosus Hunt & Breuning, 1957

References

Acanthocinini